The Object Constraint Language (OCL) is a declarative language describing rules applying to Unified Modeling Language (UML) models developed at IBM and is now part of the UML standard. Initially, OCL was merely a formal specification language extension for UML. OCL may now be used with any Meta-Object Facility (MOF) Object Management Group (OMG) meta-model, including UML. The Object Constraint Language is a precise text language that provides constraint and object query expressions on any MOF model or meta-model that cannot otherwise be expressed by diagrammatic notation. OCL is a key component of the new OMG standard recommendation for transforming models, the Queries/Views/Transformations (QVT) specification.

Description 
OCL is a descendant of Syntropy, a second-generation object-oriented analysis and design method. The OCL 1.4 definition specified a constraint language. In OCL 2.0, the definition has been extended to include general object query language definitions.

OCL statements are constructed in four parts:

 a context that defines the limited situation in which the statement is valid 
 a property that represents some characteristics of the context (e.g., if the context is a class, a property might be an attribute)
 an operation (e.g., arithmetic, set-oriented) that manipulates or qualifies a property, and 
 keywords (e.g., if, then, else, and, or, not, implies) that are used to specify conditional expressions.

Relation

OCL and UML 
OCL supplements UML by providing expressions that have neither the ambiguities of natural language nor the inherent difficulty of using complex mathematics. OCL is also a navigation language for graph-based models.

OCL and MOF 
OCL makes a Meta-Object Facility model more precise by associating assertions with its meta-elements.

OCL and QVT 
Of particular importance to Model Driven Engineering (MDE) or model-driven architecture is the notion of Model transformation. The OMG has defined a specific standard for model transformation called MOF/QVT or in short QVT. Several model transformation languages like GReAT, VIATRA, or Tefkat are presently available, with different levels of compliance with the QVT standard. Many of these languages are built on top of OCL, which is the main part of the QVT-compliance.

Alternatives 
Being a rule-based validation language, Schematron may be considered an alternative to OCL. However Schematron works for Extensible Markup Language (XML) trees while OCL makes it possible to navigate MOF-based models and meta-models (i.e. XML Metadata Interchange (XMI) trees). In other words, OCL relates to UML or MOF similarly to how Schematron relates to XML. (Note that Schematron uses XPath to navigate inside the XML trees.)Being a model specification language permitting designers to decorate a model or a meta-model with side-effect-free annotations, OCL could be replaced by languages like Alloy. Automated OCL generation is in principle possible from natural language.

Extensions 

Eclipse OCL  extends Standard OCL with additional operators and a type for Maps. AgileUML extends Standard OCL with Map and Function types. These extensions are consistent with the map and function types present in modern programming languages such as Python and Swift.

See also 
 Computer model
 Data mapping
 Domain Specific Language  (DSL)
 Domain-specific modelling (DSM)
 Eclipse GMT Project
 Gello Expression Language
 Glossary of Unified Modeling Language terms
 Intentional Programming (IP)
 List of UML tools
 Meta-modeling
 Meta-modeling technique
 Meta-Object Facility (MOF)
 Metadata
 Model-based testing (MBT) 
 Model-driven architecture (MDA)
 Model Driven Engineering (MDE)
 Model Transformation Language (MTL)
 Modeling language
 Modeling perspectives
 MOFM2T
 Object-oriented analysis and design (OOAD) 
 MOF Queries/Views/Transformations (QVT)
 Semantic translation 
 Transformation language (TL)
 UML tool
 Vocabulary-based transformation
 XMI
 XML transformation language (XTL)

References

External links 
 OMG OCL specification
 OCL Portal - The center for OCL related information
 OCL page of Computer Science Dept. of CSUSB (brief OCL 2.0 syntax)
 Octopus: OCL Tool for Precise Uml Specifications (OCL checker)
 Dresden OCL Toolkit (OCL Toolkit, various OCL related publications)
 HOL-OCL (An interactive theorem proof environment for OCL, various OCL related publications)
 OCL for Java tutorial on ParlezUML 
 Article on using EMF's OCL in Java code
 UML link page on cetus-links.org
 USE (UML-based Specification Environment) (OCL Tool for model validation, various OCL related publications)
 OCL tutorial
 NL2OCL (OCL Tool for invariant generation from NL)

Unified Modeling Language
Formal specification languages
ISO standards